Image is an original novel based on the U.S. television series Angel.

Plot summary
Cordelia Chase has a vision of a child being attacked by a squidlike demon. Meanwhile, Gunn is trying to rescue a young artist; the artist's studio is being attacked by vampires. Cordelia goes to investigate the mansion from her vision. She soon finds herself surrounded by baby products, portraits, and chased by a tentacled monster.

When Angel arrives on the scene, he is surprised to discover that he recognizes some of the portraits. He holds distant memories of him and Darla spending a night with storytellers and artists. Angel reveals that he and Darla were present at the party where Mary Shelley was inspired to write Frankenstein; indeed, they witnessed the event that gave Mary the initial idea.

An old evil is trying to use a painting to preserve the life of its body, which, in the terms of the story, inspired the novel The Picture of Dorian Gray. In their efforts to save a child the villain is focused on, Team Angel will learn not to judge everything by its image.

Tagline
"A picture is worth a thousand words."

Continuity
Supposed to be set early in Angel season 2, shortly after the episode "Epiphany".
Characters include: Angel, Cordelia Chase, Charles Gunn, Wesley Wyndam-Pryce, Merl.
Merl – the demon snitch used by Angel for most of season two – features in this novel, stealing material from a tabloid magazine and attempting to use it to blackmail Angel Investigations' current clients.

Canonical issues

Angel books such as this one are not usually considered as canonical. Some consider them stories from the imaginations of authors and artists, while others consider them as taking place in an alternative fictional reality. However unlike fan fiction, overviews summarising their story, written early in the writing process, were approved by both Fox and Joss Whedon (or his office), and the books were therefore later published as officially Buffy/Angel merchandise.

LeBron James 
In 2022, a Twitter user posted a screenshot of a page from the book where Cordelia mentions The Bronze Jade Art Gallery, with the first instance of "The Bronze Jade" circled in red with an arrow pointing to it, and an image of LeBron James encircled on the other end of the arrow. The joke, calling attention to the tenuous phonetical similarities between "The Bronze Jade" and "LeBron James", quickly became an internet meme due to its combination of juvenile wordplay and general absurdity, with many other users drawing links between arbitrary phrases and recognizable pop cultural figures.

References

External links
Litefoot1969.bravepages.com - Review of this book by Litefoot
Teen-books.com - Reviews of this book

2002 American novels
2002 fantasy novels
Angel (1999 TV series) novels
Novels by Mel Odom